Léa Rubio (born 6 May 1991 in Avignon) is a French football player who currently plays for French club Olympique de Marseille. Rubio plays as a midfielder and has been active with the France women's national football team on the youth circuit.

Career
Rubio began her career at her hometown club in Football Club Féminin Monteux in the commune of Monteux. In 2006, at the age of 15, she made her league debut with the club, who were playing in the second division of French women's football. For the 2006–07 season, Rubio started 13 matches scoring no goals. The following season, her matches played increased to 15. She also scored three goals, including one in cup play and even captained the team on several occasions. For the 2008–09 season, Rubio was selected to train at CNFE Clairefontaine, the women's section of the prestigious Clairefontaine academy. However, she eventually signed with Montpellier. With Montpellier, Rubio was designated the first team number 8 and made 11 league appearances in her first season with the team. She appeared in three cup matches scoring one goal helping Montpellier win the 2008–09 edition of the Challenge de France.

Rubio got off to a fast start for the 2009–10 season scoring three goals in her first six league matches. She has also starred for the club in the newly created UEFA Women's Champions League appearing in four matches helping the club reach the main round.

International career
Rubio has been active with the women's section of the national team. She has earned caps with the women's under-17, under-18, and under-19 teams. With the under-17 team, she participated in both the 2008 UEFA Women's Under-17 Championship and the inaugural 2008 FIFA U-17 Women's World Cup, where France were eliminated in the group stage. Rubio scored her lone goal in the tournament against the United States in the final group stage match. With the under-19s, Rubio played in the La Manga Cup international tournament and the 2009 UEFA Women's Under-19 Championship reached the semi-finals before bowing out to Sweden in extra time.

International goals

References

External links
 
 

1991 births
Living people
French people of Spanish descent
French women's footballers
France women's international footballers
Sportspeople from Avignon
CNFE Clairefontaine players
Montpellier HSC (women) players
Paris Saint-Germain Féminine players
Olympique de Marseille (women) players
Division 1 Féminine players
Women's association football midfielders
Footballers from Provence-Alpes-Côte d'Azur